Tim Sandtler (born February 20, 1987 in Bochum) is a German racing driver. He has competed in such series as International Formula Master, Formula BMW ADAC, Formula Three Euroseries and the German Formula Three Championship.

References

External links
 Official website
 

1987 births
Living people
Sportspeople from Bochum
Racing drivers from North Rhine-Westphalia
German racing drivers
German Formula Renault 2.0 drivers
Formula BMW ADAC drivers
International Formula Master drivers
Formula 3 Euro Series drivers
German Formula Three Championship drivers
Prema Powerteam drivers
Jo Zeller Racing drivers
Signature Team drivers
ISR Racing drivers
Porsche Carrera Cup Germany drivers